Lampronia sakhalinella is a moth of the family Prodoxidae. It is found on the Sakhalin peninsula in Russia.

References

Moths described in 1996
Prodoxidae
Moths of Asia